Great Totham is a village and civil parish in Maldon district, Essex, England, and midway between Chelmsford and Colchester. The village includes the Island of Osea in the Blackwater estuary and is separated into two parts, north and south. The north side and the south side are about a mile and a half apart, distributed along the B1022. The parish contains the hamlet of Totham Hill.

History
According to the old maps, before the time of the enclosures, the outskirts of Great Totham North were part of Tiptree Heath, which was then a haunt of smugglers, attested in the name of a house in Mountains Road called Spirits Hall. There is also the thatch-roofed Barn Chapel. This became a chapel in 1822 when an Isaac Foster donated the barn to be a place of worship for non-conformists.

The ancient road to Colchester by Tiptree Heath led through the parish of Great Totham, which in the reign of Queen Elizabeth I (1558–1603) was held of the Queen's manor of East Greenwich by William Beriff, an Alderman of Colchester, as her sub-tenant.
 
Great Totham village school's centenary was in 1977, but by that time the Victorian building, now demolished, had been replaced by a larger modern school on a different site. Honeywood School, a Grade II listed building, is a church school which was founded by the Honywood family of Marks Hall at Coggeshall in the mid-19th century, which had inherited the manor of Great Totham. This is still in use as the church hall and meeting room.

In the north of Great Totham there is a United Reformed Church dating to 1871. Recently refurbished, it is used for services and activities including a pre-school playgroup. Nearby, and adjoining the small village green, is the Compasses public house which dates to the late 17th century. The Prince of Wales pub in Totham South was gutted by fire in 1990 with loss of historic features, but it has been rebuilt and reopened.

Trades and crafts at Great Totham either died out or have been brought up to date. There are no longer walking stick makers, brickworks or saddlers. Old gravel pits have become recreation areas for fishing lakes.

Great Totham has a village sign. A plaque, dated October 2002, attached to the village sign of the north area reads:
On 17 October 1952, two Gloster Meteors of No 72 Squadron, Royal Air Force, crashed nearby killing both pilots.
F/O Charles Muldownie from Rotherham and P/O Ian Carmichael from Devon. Two local people were injured and many were affected by the accident.

Local people assisted at the time and this village green became the base for recovery operations by RAF personnel. This plaque is in memory of the pilots and for all those involved.

Governance
The population of the electoral ward was 3,660 at the 2011 Census. Elected representatives at different levels of government act for Great Totham and surrounding villages. Two elected district councillors represent the parish on Maldon District Council. Great Totham is part of the Witham parliamentary constituency, and is represented in the House of Commons by Priti Patel of the Conservative Party.

Community

St Peter's Church on Church Road was Grade II listed in 1959, and dates to the 13th century.

The nearest NHS (National Health Service) hospitals are Broomfield Hospital in Chelmsford and Colchester General Hospital in Colchester.

Great Totham Primary School is in Walden House Road, Great Totham. The school is divided into 14 classes, two per year group. The school's motto is "Enjoy, Respect, Achieve".
In its Ofsted inspection in October 2007, the school received an overall rating of Grade 2, 'Good'.

The closest National Rail service is in Witham or Hatfield Peverel, operated by Abellio Greater Anglia, with destinations including London Liverpool Street and Ipswich, Clacton, Harwich, Braintree and Norwich via the Great Eastern Main Line.
The nearest London Underground line is the Central line at Newbury Park.

The Witham South District of Girlguiding UK comprises two Rainbow packs for girls aged 5–7 years old, three Brownie packs for girls aged 7–10 years old, a Guide unit for girls aged 10–14 years old and a Ranger unit for girls aged over 14 that live in Wickham Bishops, Great Totham and the surrounding villages.

Climate
In East Anglia, the warmest time of the year is July and August, when maximum temperatures average around 21 °C (70 °F). The coolest time of the year is January and February, when minimum temperatures average around 1 °C (34 °F) East Anglia's average annual rainfall is about 605 millimetres , with October to January being the wettest months.

References

External links

Great Totham Primary School
Great Totham Cricket Club

Maldon District
Villages in Essex